The 2018–19 Women's Big Bash League season or WBBL|04 was the fourth season of the Women's Big Bash League (WBBL), the semi-professional women's Twenty20 domestic cricket competition in Australia. The tournament ran from 1 December 2018 to 26 January 2019.

Double-defending champions, the Sydney Sixers, ended the regular season on top of the ladder, while captain Ellyse Perry broke the scoring record for a sole WBBL campaign and was named Player of the Tournament.

In the two semi-finals at Drummoyne Oval on 19 January, the Brisbane Heat eliminated the Sydney Thunder before the Sydney Sixers knocked out the Melbourne Renegades. Both matches, notable for their "miracle" endings, were hailed as a showcase of "the irrefutable rise of women's cricket" and "sport with drama, skill and unpredictability – a potent recipe for success".

In the final, also at Drummoyne Oval, the Heat caused an upset by defeating the Sixers with three wickets in hand and four balls remaining to claim their maiden title. Despite suffering from the flu and heat stroke, Beth Mooney managed to play a pivotal innings of 65 runs from 46 balls and was named Player of the Final.

Teams 
Each squad featured 15 active players, with an allowance of up to five marquee signings including a maximum of three from overseas. Under a new rule, Australian marquees were defined as players who held a national women's team contract at the time of signing on for their WBBL|04 team. This, combined with the introduction of two-year contracts ahead of the previous season, meant that the Sydney Sixers would inadvertently exceed their marquee player limit in 2018–19. To address this inequity, an injured or unavailable Sixers marquee could only be replaced by a domestic player.

Personnel changes

Local players 
The table below lists local player movements made ahead of the season.

Changes made during the season included:

 Mikayla Hinkley (who had previously played for the Sydney Thunder and Perth Scorchers) signed with the Hobart Hurricanes as a replacement player.

Overseas players 
The table below lists changes to overseas player allocations made ahead of the season.

Changes made during the season included:

 New Zealand marquee Hayley Jensen (who had previously played for the Melbourne Stars and Melbourne Renegades) signed with the Perth Scorchers as a replacement player.
New Zealand marquee Katey Martin signed with the Melbourne Stars as a replacement player. Martin had performed a similar role with the Melbourne Stars in WBBL|03.

Leadership 
Coaching changes made ahead of the season included:

 Salliann Briggs was appointed head coach of the Hobart Hurricanes, replacing Julia Price.

Captaincy changes made ahead of the season included:

Sasha Moloney was appointed captain of the Hobart Hurricanes, replacing Corinne Hall.
Meg Lanning assumed the captaincy of the Perth Scorchers, replacing Elyse Villani.

Captaincy changes made during the season included:

 Erin Osborne stood in as acting captain of the Melbourne Stars for eight games, replacing Kristen Beams who was sidelined with Achilles and finger injuries.
Elyse Villani stood in as acting captain of the Perth Scorchers for five games, replacing Meg Lanning who was sidelined with a back injury.

Points table

Win–loss table 
Below is a summary of results for each team's fourteen regular season matches, plus finals where applicable, in chronological order. A team's opponent for any given match is listed above the margin of victory/defeat.

Fixtures
All times are local time

Week 1

Week 2

Week 3

Week 4

Week 5

Week 6

Week 7

Knockout phase
{{4TeamBracket
|RD1-seed1= 2
|RD1-team1= Sydney Thunder
|RD1-score1= 7/136
|RD1-seed2= 3
|RD1-team2= Brisbane Heat
|RD1-score2=7/140
|RD1-seed3= 1|RD1-team3= Sydney Sixers|RD1-score3=4/131
|RD1-seed4= 4
|RD1-team4= Melbourne Renegades
|RD1-score4= 6/131
|RD2-seed1= 3
|RD2-team1= Brisbane Heat
|RD2-seed2= 1
|RD2-team2=Sydney Sixers
|RD2-score1='7/132
|RD2-score2=7/131
}}

Semi-finals

Final

 Statistics 

 Highest totals 

 Most runs 

 Most wickets 

 Awards 

 Player of the tournament 
Player of the Tournament votes are awarded on a 3-2-1 basis by the two standing umpires at the conclusion of every match, meaning a player can receive a maximum of six votes per game.

Source: WBBL|04 Player of the Tournament

 Team of the tournament 
A twelve-player honorary squad recognising the standout performers of WBBL|04 was named by cricket.com.au:
 Ellyse Perry (Sydney Sixers) – captain Sophie Devine (Adelaide Strikers)
 Alyssa Healy (Sydney Sixers) – wicket-keeper Meg Lanning (Perth Scorchers)
 Grace Harris (Brisbane Heat)
 Stafanie Taylor (Sydney Thunder)
 Sammy-Jo Johnson (Brisbane Heat)
 Heather Graham (Perth Scorchers)
 Delissa Kimmince (Brisbane Heat)
 Marizanne Kapp (Sydney Sixers)
 Molly Strano (Melbourne Renegades)
 Sophie Molineux (Melbourne Renegades) – 12th player''

Young gun award 
Players under 21 years of age at the start of the season are eligible for the Young Gun Award. Weekly winners are selected over the course of the season by a panel of Cricket Australia officials based on match performance, on-field and off-field attitude, and their demonstration of skill, tenacity and good sportsmanship. Each weekly winner receives a $500 Rebel gift card and the overall winner receives a $5000 cash prize, as well as access to a learning and mentor program.

Melbourne Renegades leg-spinner Georgia Wareham was named the Young Gun of WBBL|04 after claiming 11 wickets and finishing the regular season with the best economy rate in the league.

"Player of the match" tally
The table below shows the number of Player of the Match awards won by each player throughout the season. The career tally indicates the number of awards won by a player throughout her entire time in the league at the conclusion of the season, including awards won while previously playing for a different WBBL team.

Attendance 
A total of 135,861 fans attended WBBL|04—an average of 2,384 per match (excluding the two games abandoned due to rain). This included some double-headers with men's BBL matches, such as the crowd of 14,983 reported for the match between Perth and Brisbane on Boxing Day played at Optus Stadium, and the crowd of 11,136 reported for the New Year's Day match at the Melbourne Cricket Ground between the Stars and Renegades.

A new record for the highest attendance at a standalone WBBL match was set on 5 January when the Brisbane Heat played the Adelaide Strikers at Harrup Park in front of 5,650 spectators. A total of 8,735 people attended the knockout stage of the tournament across two weekends at Drummoyne Oval, with all ticket proceeds donated to Dolly’s Dream. The final was announced as a sellout and attracted a crowd of 5,368.

Audience 
A total of twenty-three matches were televised on Seven Network and Fox Cricket The remaining 36 matches were live streamed on the Cricket Australia website as well as the Cricket Australia Live App  for mobile.

Below are the television ratings for every game that was broadcast by Seven Network and Fox Cricket during the season. The semi-final super over between the Sixers and Renegades was watched by a combined average audience of 423,000 (196,000 metro; 133,000 regional; 94,000 subscription). The final was the most-watched WBBL game ever with a combined average audience of 479,000 and peaking at 812,000.

Cricket Australia reported over 3.8 million highlight views on their YouTube channel and almost 10 million minutes viewed on the Cricket Network's live stream, with a 38 per cent rise of minutes viewed in Australia compared to the previous season.

See also
2018–19 Big Bash League season

References

Further reading

Notes

External links
 Official fixtures
 Series home at ESPN Cricinfo

 
2018–19 Women's Big Bash League season by team
Women's Big Bash League seasons
!
Women's Big Bash League